Stephen S. F. Chen is a Taiwanese politician.

Biography

Early life
Chen was born in Nanjing. During the Sino-Japanese War, he and his family followed the national government to Chongqing. At the end of the Second World War, the family moved back to Nanjing. With the coming of the Chinese Civil War, he went to live with the family of his elder sister in Manila, Philippines where he attended Chiang Kai Shek High School now Chiang Kai Shek College. He graduated from the University of Santo Tomas with a BA in 1957 and an MA in political science in 1959 from Manila, Philippines. .

Career
In 1960, Chen entered the Ministry of Foreign Affairs of the Republic of China. He served in Rio de Janeiro, Brazil; Argentina; and Bolivia. He was consul general in Atlanta from 1973 to 1979, when the United States ceased to recognize the Republic of China. From 1997 to 2000, Chen was director of the Taipei Economic and Cultural Representative Office in Washington, D.C., representing the interests of the Republic of China in the United States as a de facto ambassador.

United States Mission
Ambassador Chen served as the head of the mission of the Republic of China in the USA from 1997-2000. On April 26, 2005, he traveled with former Republic of China Vice President Lien Chan and other Kuomintang members to mainland China to meet with the leaders of the Communist Party of China.  In November, 2008 he traveled with Lien Chan, special envoy of President Ma Ying-Jeou to the APEC meeting in Lima, Peru where in a side meeting they met with the General Secretary of the Communist Party of China Hu Jintao, in the highest level of official exchange between mainland China and Taiwan on an international stage. He currently serves as National Policy Advisor to the President of the Republic of China on Taiwan. He recently spoke at the Center for Strategic and International Studies on the position of the Republic of China on the Diaoyutai issue.

International Services

A short list of his posts follows:

First Secretary in the Embassy for the Republic of China in Rio de Janeiro, Brazil, 1963-1969.

Adviser, Republic of China Delegation to the Annual Meeting of the IMF and World Bank, Rio de Janeiro, 1967.

Chief, Second Section, Latin American Affairs Department, the Ministry of Foreign Affairs, Republic of China, Taiwan 1969-1971.

Counselor, Embassy for the Republic of China in Buenos Aires, Argentine 1971-1972.

Charge d'Affair in La Paz, Bolivia, 1972-1973.

Consul General in the Atlanta consulate of Republic of China, 1973-1979.

Director General for the Atlanta office of the Coordination Council for North American Affairs, 1980.

Director General for the Chicago office of the Coordination Council for North American Affairs, 1980-1982.

Consul General attached to the Secretariat, Ministry of Foreign Affairs, Republic of China, Taiwan, 1982–1984

Director General, Department of Treaty & Legal Affairs,
Ministry of Foreign Affairs, Republic of China, Taiwan, 1984–1986

Director General, Department of International Organizations,
Ministry of Foreign Affairs, Republic of China, Taiwan, 1986–1988

Director General for Los Angeles office of the Coordination Council for North American Affairs, 1988-1989.

Deputy Ambassador, Coordination Council for North American Affairs,  in Washington D.C. 1989-1993.

Vice Minister of Foreign Affairs, 1993-96.

Deputy Secretary General of the Office of the President, Republic of China, 1996-1997.

Ambassador, Head of the Taipei Economic and Cultural Representative Office in the United States, Washington D.C. 1997-2000.

References

External links
 
 
 

1934 births
Living people
University of Santo Tomas alumni
Politicians from Nanjing
Taiwanese Ministers of Foreign Affairs
Republic of China politicians from Jiangsu
Chinese Civil War refugees
Chinese emigrants to the Philippines
Chinese diplomats
Educators from Nanjing
Taiwanese people from Jiangsu
Representatives of Taiwan to the United States